The 1930 All-Ireland Senior Hurling Championship was the 44th staging of the All-Ireland Senior Hurling Championship, the Gaelic Athletic Association's premier inter-county hurling tournament. The championship began on 18 May 1930 and ended on 7 September 1930.

Cork entered the championship as the defending champions, however, they were defeated by Clare in the Munster semi-final.

On 7 September 1930, Tipperary won the championship following a 5-06 to 3-06 victory over Dublin in the All-Ireland final at Croke Park. This was their 11th championship title overall and their first title since 1925.

Teams

A total of twelve teams contested the championship, the same number of participants from the previous championship. There were no new entrants.

Team summaries

Results

Leinster Senior Hurling Championship

First round

Semi-finals

Final

Munster Senior Hurling Championship

First round

Semi-finals

Final

All-Ireland Senior Hurling Championship

Semi-final

Final

Championship statistics

Miscellaneous

 On 13 July 1930, the Munster semi-final between Tipperary and Waterford ended in disarray after the referee, Seán Óg Murphy, attempted to send off John and Charlie Ware of Waterford and John Joe Callanan of Tipperary. The Waterford players refused to leave and there was a delay of 12 minutes. The referee awarded the match to Tipperary.
 Tipperary become the first team to win the Triple Crown of hurling by winning the All-Ireland titles in the senior, junior and minor grades.

Sources

 Corry, Eoghan, The GAA Book of Lists (Hodder Headline Ireland, 2005).
 Donegan, Des, The Complete Handbook of Gaelic Games (DBA Publications Limited, 2005).

References

External links
 1930 All-Ireland Hurling Championship

1930
1930 in hurling